The 1978–79 Iowa State Cyclones men's basketball team represented Iowa State University during the 1978–79 NCAA Division I men's basketball season. The Cyclones were coached by Lynn Nance, who was in his third season with the Cyclones.They played their home games at Hilton Coliseum in Ames, Iowa.

They finished the season 11–16, 6–8 in Big Eight play to finish in sixth place. The Cyclones lost in the first round of the Big Eight tournament to Kansas, falling 91-70.

Roster

Schedule and results 

|-
!colspan=6 style=""|Exhibition

|-
!colspan=6 style=""|Regular Season

|-
!colspan=6 style=""|Big Eight tournament

|-

References 

Iowa State Cyclones men's basketball seasons
Iowa State
Iowa State Cyc
Iowa State Cyc